Simon Mangan (died 1906) was a landowner and Lord Lieutenant of Meath from 1894 to 1906.  A JP, he was also in business with his son-in-law Patrick Leonard in moving cattle between the west and east of Ireland.

Mangan was the son of John Mangan (1788–1868) and Margaret (née) Duffy (d. 1843).  He lived at Dunboyne Castle, which remained in his family until 1950, and married Margaret (née) Larkin (1839–1921), a first cousin of Brigadier Paul Kenna VC. Of his daughters, Minnie married the architect Ralph Byrne, Emily married Patrick Leonard and Kathleen married Cmdr Ralph Tindal-Carill-Worsley.

References

People from County Meath
 
History of County Meath
Irish unionists
1906 deaths
19th-century Irish people
Year of birth missing